Arab entrepreneurship initiatives: this is an alphabetical list of major, active, multi-year initiatives taken to promote entrepreneurship in Arab-majority countries. It includes private-sector, government, NGO and INGO initiatives.

Agence Nationale de Développement de l’Investissement (ANDI, the National Investment Development Agency)
 ANVREDET — Research Development Agency
 Global Innovation through Science and Technology (GIST) initiative
 CDTA — Centre for Advanced Technologies
 CERIST — National Research Centre
 DZ-Invest — The Foreign Direct Investment Agency
 EPA-ANSA Technology Park, City of Medicine and Cyber Park
 EU Delegation in Algeria[
 FINALEP
 SIPAREX
 Startup-week end
 Pépiniere d'entreprises Ouargla
 entrepreneurship4Youth
 Maghreb Start-up Initiative

{These need review and redacting.}

Bahrain Business Incubator Centre
 Bahrain Development Bank
 Global Innovation through Science and Technology (GIST) initiative

Global Innovation through Science and Technology (GIST) initiative

Global Innovation through Science and Technology (GIST) initiative

Technology Innovation and Entrepreneurship Centre (TIEC)
 INJAZ EGYPT, part of INJAZ
 Ideavelopers
 Ahead of the Curve 
 American University in Cairo (AUC) School of Business
 Ashoka
 Endeavor-Egypt
 Yomken.com
 Yadaweya.com
 Elmashrou3.tv
 Innoventures.me
 Flat6labs
  RiseUp Summit
 Algebra Ventures ($50 million venture fund)
 GESR
 YESMENA
 Global Innovation through Science and Technology (GIST) initiative
 Gisr Institution for Survey Research
Entrepreneurs' Society

Global Innovation through Science and Technology (GIST) initiative

Zain Innovation Campus "ZINC"
TTi
 TTi - She Innovate
 TTi - 02 Incubator
 TTi - 03 Incubator
SFH
 The Tank by Umniah
 The University of Jordan Innovation and entrepreneurship Center 
 Trip to Innovation - Ideas Accelerator
 MusicBasha.com The digital music store for independent Arab music
 Arcoten Holdings - Pan Arab entrepreneurship development and venture foundry
 N2V
 Alwatani (National Microfinance Bank of Jordan, NGO)
 Al Urdonia Lil Ebda
 Atlas Investment
 Al-Quds College 
 Bidaya Ventures
 Business Development Center (BDC)
 Creative Jordan
 Endeavor-Jordan
 EFE-Jordan
 Entreprise Productivity Centre
 www.Exxab.com
 Global Innovation through Science and Technology (GIST) initiative
 INJAZ
 Jordan Career Education Foundation
 MENA100
 MENA Apps
 Queen Rania Center for Entrepreneurship
 Najah
 Jordan Forum for Business and Professional Women
 National Fund for Enterprise Support
 Jordan Venture Projects
 "Incubators":   
 Al-Quds College Business Incubator
 HCST-ICT Incubator
 JFBPW Incubator
 RSS - EE&IE Incubator
 AECE Incubator system at Al Yarmouk
 U of Jordan Agro-Industry Incubator
 JTG Incubator
 NACTIB - National Network of Incubators
 Cyber City
 Meydan 
 Oasis500
 Young Entrepreneurs Association
 AZprofile.com
 KAFD-International Travel Support
 Crown Prince Foundation
 Arab Innovation Network
 Jordan Education Initiative
 Reach 2025
 1000 Entrepreneurs
 J-CORE

Global Innovation through Science and Technology (GIST) initiative
 INJAZ
 Fikra www.fikraprogram.com

TEC - Tripoli Entrepreneurs Club
 Amideast, Cisco Entrepreneurship Institute
 Association for the Development of Rural Capacities
 Association Entraide Professionnelle
 Al Majmoua (microfinance)
 Al-Iktissad Wal-Aamal (magazine)
 AltCity - creative startup community (coworking, cafe, startup programs)
 Ameen (microfinance)
 Cedars Consultants and Traders' Group
 Center For Entrepreneurship and Innovation at the AUB American University of Beirut
 Bader Lebanon
 Berytech
 BIAT Center (Business Incubation Association of Tripoli)
 Center For Entrepreneurship @ Beirut Arab University
 Dragons Den: Al Aareen, on Beirut's Future Television
 Euro-Lebanese Centre For Industrial Modernsation
 eClub (The Entrepreneurship club) www.oureclub.com
 Georges N. Frem Foundation
 Global Innovation through Science and Technology (GIST) initiative
 Ijma3
 Imdad logistics a Middle East 4PL services provider (Logistics Management) 
 Kafalat: a 75% publicly owned financial company that assists SMEs to access commercial bank funding.
 Partnership for Lebanon (Ghafari, Cisco, Intel, Microsoft, Occidental Petroleum)
 Lira
 MACLE
 Makhzoumi Foundation
 MOET (Ministry of Economy and Trade)
 MIT Enterprise Forum of the Pan Arab Region (known for its annual MIT Arab Business Plan Competition)
 OX Factory The Startup Factory
 Philips Innovation Program (housed at Berytech)
 Qualeb Programme
 René Moawad Foundation
 RootSpace
 SME Unit (of the Ministry of Economy and Trade)
 South BIC (Business Incubation Center, Saida)
Speed@BDD
 WAY SAL - Cedars consultants and Traders'Group
 Young Arab Women Entrepreneurs (YAWE)
 YallaStartup

Global Innovation through Science and Technology (GIST) initiative

Al Akhawayan University
 Amideast, Cisco Entrepreneurship Institute 
 AFEM, Moroccan Businesswomen's Association
 ANPME - The National SME Association
 ANPME - National SME Agency
 Jamalullail Corporation Berhads
 Biotech Maroc
 CAC - Network of Business Advisory Bureaus
 Casablanca Technopark
 CMPP - Moroccan Centre for Clean Manufacturing
 CREFACE - Network of Business Start-up Centres
 Education for Employment Foundation (EFE-Maroc)
 Global Innovation through Science and Technology (GIST) initiative
 Government Ministries {revise: only leave in if sub-links relate directly to entrepreneurship}
 MCI - Ministry of Industry and Commerce
 The Ministry for Privatisation
 OMPIC - National Intellectual Property Bureau
 Network Maroc Entrepreneurs
 OFPPT - National Manpower and Professional Training Bureau
 PTR - A National Technology Services Network
 RMIE — Moroccan Incubator and Start-up network
 R+D Maroc — The Moroccan RTD Association
Moroccan Center for Innovation and Social Entrepreneurship www.mcise.org
 Enactus-Morocco
 University incubators:
 National University System
 L’Université Mohammed Premier Oujda
 CUDI — Incubator at Doukala University
 CIE — Centre Incubator d’Entreprises
 CIT — Centre d’Incubation Technologique at EMI Rabat
 Incubator de l’ENIM
 IT Incubateur at INPT-ENSIAS Rabat
 Incubator ‘MA-IN’ at the Faculté des Sciences Semlalia Marrakech
 Incubator at the Faculté des Sciences et Techniques Beni Mallal
 Incubator at the Faculté des Sciences El Jadida
 Maghreb Start-up Initiative

Zubair Small Enterprises Centre (Zubair SEC) www.zubairsec.org (by The Zubair Corporation)
 Amideast, Cisco Entrepreneurship Institute 
 Fund for the Development of Youth Projects:
 Sharakah
 Global Innovation through Science and Technology (GIST) initiative
 Shell Oil's Intilaaqah (social investment programme)
 Ministry of Commerce and Industry:
 Knowledge Oasis Muscat
 Omani Centre for Investment and Export Development
 Ruwad: magazine launched in 2009, in conjunction with Intilaaqah, Sharakah, and Alam Aliktisaad Wala’mal, by United Press & Publishing.
 SANAD
 The 2006 World Summit on Innovation and Entrepreneurship (WSIE) was held in Muscat

Amideast, Cisco Entrepreneurship Institute 
 Bader ICT Incubator (http://www.bader.ps/)
 Arabreneur (http://arabreneur.com/)
 EFE West Bank/Gaza
 Gaza Sky Geeks (http://www.gazaskygeeks.com/) 
 Palestine Investment Promotion Agency
 Palestine Information and Communication Technology Incubator (PICTI)
 Young Entrepreneurs of Palestine (YEP)
 Leaders Organization's eZone which includes (http://www.leaders.ps):
 eZone startup incubation space
 FastForward Accelerator
 Entrepreneurs' Cafe
 Tawasul - Global Connections Center - "Qudrat" Initiative (Social Entrepreneurship)http://www.tawasul.co.om/
 Tomorrow's Youth Organization
 Community Development & Continuing Education Institute

Arab Youth Venture
 Bedaya Center
 Enterprise Qatar
 INJAZ Qatar
Qatar University Innovation and Entrepreneurship Contest (QUIEC)- College of Engineering and College of Business and Economics
 Qatar Mobility Innovations Center (QMIC)
 Global Innovation through Science and Technology (GIST) initiative
  Qatar Business Incubation Center (QBIC)
  Qatar Foundation
 Qatar Science & Technology Park
 Stars of Science
 Social Development Center
 Silatech
Stars of Science

Badir Program for technology Incubators and Accelerators.
 Centennial Fund National Entrepreneurship Center
 Center for development of S&M Facilities
 Global Competitiveness Forum
 Global Innovation through Science and Technology (GIST) initiative
 Imdad logistics Logistics Consultants .www.imdadlogistics.com
 INJAZ-Saudi Arabia, to inspire and prepare Saudi youth to succeed in a global, knowledge based economy. (www.injaz-.org)
 King Abdullah University of Science and Technology - www.kaust.edu.sa and innovation.kaust.edu.sa
(KAUST runs startup accelerators including the Hikma IP-based Startup Accelerator and New Ventures Accelerator) 
 King Saud University
 National entrepreneurship Institute (Riyadah)www.riyadah.com.sa
 Qotuf AlRiyadah.www.qotuf.com
 Saudi Entrepreneurship Development Institute
 Saudi Fast Growth 100
Uhuru
Tasamy for Social Entrepreneurship www.tasamy.com
 Women's Incubator and Training Center



Engvillage (http://www.engvillage.com)

HIAST — Higher Institute for Advanced S&T
 Junior Chamber International — Syria
 MAWRED Incubator for women entrepreneurs
 SEBC — Syrian-Enterprise & Business Centre
 SEBC - BI SEBC Business Incubator
 SKILLS
 Syrian Management Consultants Association 
 Business Angels Gate
 Syrian Computer Society's ICT (see also MBRF Arab Incubator Network)
 Syria Trust for Development
 Massar
 Shabab
 FIRDOS - Fund for Integrated Rural Development of Syria
 BIDAYA(founded by Asma Assad in conjunction with Youth Business International, FIRDOS, MAWRED, and SYEA)
 SYEA - Syrian Young Entrepreneurs Association

Agence de Promotion Industrielle (API)
 Centre de Soutien à la Création d'Entreprise
 Amideast, Cisco Entrepreneurship Institute 
 Organisation Arab Pour l'Education, la Culture et les Sciences (headquarters, ALECSO)
 Centre des Jeunes Dirigeants d’Entreprise
 Global Innovation through Science and Technology (GIST) initiative
 Institute Arabe des Chefs d'Entreprise (IACE, iaceonline.com)
 Centre des Jeunes Entrepreneurs (CJE)
 Intilaq 
 Jeune Chambre de Commerce de Tunisie
 Maghreb Start-up Initiative

Al Tamimi Investments' The Big Start
 Al Tomooh Finance Scheme for Small National Business (in conjunction with EmiratesNBD Bank and Sheikh Mohammed)
 Arab Business Angels Network
 Arab Youth Venture Foundation
 Baraka private consultancy
 Dubai Enterprise Center (business incubation center in Dubai Airport Free Zone)
 FasterCapital
 Forsa business plan competition
 Global Innovation through Science and Technology (GIST) initiative
 Hub Dubai (non-profit, member-based accelerator for business ventures for good)
 Kanara Entrepreneurs Ltd.
 Khalifa Fund
 Mohamed Bin Rashid Establishment For Young Business Leaders, "SME"
 Mohamed Bin Rashid Fund (MBRF; see also Regional and global initiatives, below)
 Sawaed
 SEED Entrepreneurship Centre (Investing, mentoring, and training Entrepreneurs on the world-renowned Lean Launchpad in Dubai)
 Arab Human Capital Challenge
 Arab Incubator Network
 N2V
 SMEinfo
 Tecom {MOU w/ MBRF}
 The Indus Entrepreneurs
 TURN8
 Young Arab Leaders (YAL)
 Wamda

ROWAD Entrepreneurs Foundation
 Al-Amal Microfinance Bank
 Education for Employment - Yemen
 French Embassy Youth Enterprise Project
 Federation of Yemen Chambers of Commerce and Industry
 Global Innovation through Science and Technology (GIST) initiative 
 GTZ Yemen
 Small and Micro Enterprise Promotion Service
 Small Enterprise Development Fund
 Social Fund for Development
 SOUL
 Yemen Business Club
 Youth Leadership Development Forum

Regional initiatives in the Arab League 
 Arab Innovation Network AIN
 Arab Youth Venture Foundation AYVF
 Awesome Foundation Dubai AFD
 National Net Ventures by National Technology Group N2V
 Abdul Latif Jameel Community Initiatives
 Abraaj Capital
 Abraaj Capital Arts Prize
 Celebration of Entrepreneurship
 Riyada Enterprise Development  (RED)
 Wamda.com 
 Acumen Fund
 AIESEC
 American University in Cairo (AUC) School of Business
 Entrepreneurs Society 
 Women's Entrepreneurship and Leadership Program
 Entrepreneurship and Innovation Program
 El-Khazindar Business Research and Case Center (KCC)
 Arab League Educational, Cultural and Scientific Organization (ALECSO, headquartered in Tunis)
 Arab Technology Business Plan Competition (begun in 2006, by the Arab Science and Technology Foundation and Intel Corporation)
 Arabreneur
 Ashoka
 Business Bridge Initiative
 Center for International Private Enterprise (CIPE)
 CISCO
 The Cisco Entrepreneur Institute
 Cisco Networking Academy
 Deloitte
 Deloitte Middle East
 Deloitte Turkey -  Deloitte Educational foundation
 Dun & Bradstreet SME Advisory Services
 Education for Employment Foundation
 Dragons Den: Al Aareen, on Beirut's Future Television
 Education for Employment Foundation
 (See also their branches in Egypt, Morocco, Yemen, Jordan, and Palestine.)
 Endeavor
 Endeavor Core Focus 
 LIFT-OFF
 Envestors
 European Training Foundation (ETF)
 Global Entrepreneurship Week
 Global Innovation through Science and Technology (GIST) initiative
 Grameen-Jameel Pan-Arab Microfinance Ltd.
 INJAZ
 (See also Injaz's country chapters in a dozen countries: Jordan, Morocco, Tunisia, Egypt, Palestine, Lebanon, Saudi Arabia, Kuwait, Bahrain, Qatar, UAE, Oman; and forthcoming in Algeria, Libya, Syria, and Yemen.)
 (See also Junior Achievement)
 Intel Corporation
 The Intel Education Initiative 
 Intel Capital Middle East and Turkey Fund
 The Intel Higher Education Program 
 Technology Entrepreneurship - Theory to Practice
 The Arab Technology Business Plan Competition
 Intel Learn Technology and Entrepreneurship 
 TechnoWomen Program
 International Finance Corporation
 Private Enterprise Partnership for MENA
 Gender Entrepreneurship Markets for MENA
 International Labour Organization initiatives:
 Know About Business (KAB)
 Start and Improve Your Business (SIYB)
 Small Enterprise Development (SEED)
 Youth Entrenet (with Swiss Agency for Development and Cooperation)
 Junior Achievement
 Kauffman Foundation
 Entrepreneurship.org
 Global Entrepreneurship Week
 Larta Institute
 Legatum Institute
 Legatum Ventures
 Mohammed bin Rashid Fund (MBRF)
 Arab Incubator Network
 Sawaed
 Arab Human Capital Challenge
 Philips Innovation Program
 Manpower
 Entrepreneurship Training (Regional—Middle East and Africa)
 joint-venture with Junior Achievement (Global)
 YouthConnect (Global)
 NBS Entrepreneurial Screening (Global)
 Mohammed bin Rashid Al Maktoum Centre for Entrepreneurship and Innovation at the American University of Beirut
 {Add other major regional MBRF regional initiatives here}
 Microsoft
 DreamSpark 
 Microsoft BizSpark 
 The Imagine Cup 
 Microsoft Innovation Centers (MIC)
 MIT-Legatum Center for Development & Entrepreneurship
 MENA-OECD Investment Programme
 Middle East Partnership Initiative (MEPI)
 Middle East Youth Initiative, MEYI
 Network For Teaching Entrepreneurship (NFTE)
 Silatech
 StartUp Arabia (www.StartupArabia.com)
 Students in Free Enterprise (SIFE)
 Synergos 
 Arab World Social Innovators Program
 TechWadi
 The Prince of Wales' Youth Business International (YBI)
 (See above: Saudi Arabia's Centennial Fund, Syria's Bidaya, Yemen, etc.)
 The European Training Foundation (ETF, etf.europa.eu)
 UNIDO
 Wamda 
 World Bank
 Doing Business (with IFC)
 {List here other WB initiatives focused on MENA entrepreneurship}
 World Economic Forum (Global)
 Global Education Initiative : Entrepreneurship Education in MENA
 YallaStartup
 YESMENA
 Yomken.com
 Young Arab Leaders (YAL)
 Young Presidents Organization-MENA (YPO-MENA)
 Youth Enterprise Generator

See also
 Entrepreneurship Policies in the Arab world 
Entrepreneurship Policies in Egypt
Entrepreneurship Policies in Saudi Arabia
Entrepreneurship Policies in Syria
Entrepreneurship Policies in United Arab Emirates

References

Society-related lists
Economy of the Arab League
Economy of the Middle East
Entrepreneurship Initiatives